The shining thicket rat (Grammomys poensis) is a species of rodent in the family Muridae.

Distribution and habitat

It is found in Angola, Burundi, Cameroon, Central African Republic, Republic of the Congo, Democratic Republic of the Congo, Ivory Coast, Equatorial Guinea, Gabon, Ghana, Guinea, Liberia, Nigeria, Rwanda, and Uganda.

Its natural habitats are subtropical or tropical moist lowland forest, subtropical or tropical moist montane forest, and subtropical or tropical moist shrubland.

Synonyms and homonyms

The species is more commonly referred to as G. rutilans, but Musser and Carleton (2005) noted that Mus rutilans Peters, 1876 is a junior homonym of Mus rutilans Olfers, 1818, which refers to the South American Oxymycterus rutilans.

References
 Dieterlen, F. 2004.  Grammomys rutilans.   2006 IUCN Red List of Threatened Species.   Downloaded on 19 July 2007.

Grammomys
Mammals described in 1965
Taxonomy articles created by Polbot